The Tonga national under-20 football team represents Tonga in international Under 20 or youth football competitions and is controlled by the Tonga Football Association.

OFC

The OFC Under 20 Qualifying Tournament is a tournament held once every two years to decide the only two qualification spots for the Oceania Football Confederation (OFC) and its representatives at the FIFA U-20 World Cup.

FIFA U-20 World Cup

Current squad
The following players were called up for the 2022 OFC U-19 Championship from 7 to 20 September 2022. Names in italics denote players who have been capped for the Senior team.

Caps and goals as of 16 September 2022 after the game against Fiji.

Fixtures and results

2016

2018

References

External links
 Tonga Football Federation official website

under-20
Oceanian national under-20 association football teams